New Jersey Transit operates the following routes from Atlantic City, originating from the Atlantic City Bus Terminal, to points elsewhere in southern New Jersey. Most services run on the Atlantic City Expressway for some distance, and is noted below.

These routes run 24 hours a day.

Routes
Below shown is the full route. Some trips may only serve a portion of the route. All routes, except for 555, originate from the Atlantic City Bus Terminal.

Additional limited and seasonal service to the Wildwoods and Cape May via Ocean City and Avalon-by-the-Sea is available through limited 319 service.

Former routes
This list includes routes that have been renumbered or are now operated by private companies.

External links
New Jersey Transit - Bus

 550
Atlantic City, New Jersey
Transportation in Atlantic County, New Jersey
Lists of New Jersey bus routes